The Sepang International Circuit is a motorsport race track in Sepang, Selangor, Malaysia. It hosted the Formula One Malaysian Grand Prix between 1999 and 2017, and is also the venue for the Malaysian Motorcycle Grand Prix, the Malaysia Merdeka Endurance Race and other major motorsport events.

History

The circuit was designed by German designer Hermann Tilke, who would subsequently design circuits including in Shanghai, Sakhir, Istanbul, Marina Bay and Yas Marina. As part of a series of major infrastructure projects in the 1990s under Mahathir Mohamad's government, the Sepang International Circuit was constructed between 1997 and 1999 close to Putrajaya, the then-newly founded administrative capital of the country, with the intent of hosting the Malaysian Grand Prix. Similar to other of the country's circuits, the circuit is known for its unpredictable humid tropical weather, varying from clear furnace hot days to tropical rain storms.

The circuit was officially inaugurated by the 4th Prime Minister of Malaysia Mahathir Mohamad on 7 March 1999 at 20:30 MST (UTC+08:00). He subsequently went on to inaugurate the first Moto GP Malaysian Grand Prix on 20 April 1999 (see 1999 Malaysian motorcycle Grand Prix) and the first Formula One Petronas Malaysian Grand Prix on 17 October 1999 (see 1999 Malaysian Grand Prix).

On 23 October 2011, on the second lap of the MotoGP Shell Advance Malaysian Grand Prix, the Italian motorcycle racer Marco Simoncelli died following a crash in turn 11 on Lap 2, resulting in an abandonment of the race.

The track was completely resurfaced in 2016 with the support of italian designers Dromo, with several corners reprofiled to emphasize mechanical, rather than aerodynamic grip. Notably, the final corner was raised by approximately 1 meter, which officials claimed would force drivers to take a later apex and explore different racing lines through the hairpin.

In October 2016 it was rumored that the Sepang circuit may be dropped from the Formula One calendar due to dwindling ticket sales, and held its nineteenth and last World Championship Grand Prix in 2017. The race's contract was due to expire in 2018, but its future had been under threat due to rising hosting fees and declining ticket sales.

Layout

Other configurations of the Sepang circuit can also be used. The north circuit is also raced in a clockwise direction. It is basically the first half of the main circuit.

The south circuit is the other half of the racecourse. The back straight of the main circuit becomes the pit straight when the south circuit is in use, and joins onto turn 8 of the main circuit to form a hairpin turn.

Sepang International Circuit also features kart racing and motocross facilities.

Track configurations

A lap in a Formula One car

Sepang starts with a long pit straight where the DRS zone exists – crucial for drivers to get a good exit out of the last corner to gain as much speed as possible. Turn 1 is a very long, slow corner taken in second gear. Most drivers brake incredibly late and lose speed gradually as they file round the corner, similar to Shanghai's first turn but slower. Turn 1 leads straight into Turn 2, a tight left hairpin which goes downhill quite significantly. The first two corners are quite bumpy, making it hard to put power onto the track. Turn 3 is a long flat out right hander which leads into Turn 4 – known locally as the Langkawi Curve – a second gear, right-angle right-hander. Turns 5 and 6 make up an incredibly high-speed, long chicane that hurts tyres and puts a lot of stress on drivers due to high G-Force. It is locally known as the Genting Curve. Turns 7 and 8 (the KLIA curve) make up a long, medium-speed, double-apex right hander, and a bump can cause the car to lose balance here. Turn 9 is a very slow left-hand hairpin (the Berjaya Tioman Corner), similar to turn two but uphill. Turn 10 leads into a challenging, medium-speed right hander at turn 11, requiring braking and turning simultaneously. Turn 12 is a flat-out, bumpy left which immediately leads into the flat right at turn 13, then the challenging 'Sunway Lagoon' curve at turn 14. Similar to turn 11, it requires hard-braking and steering at the same time. It is taken in second gear. The long back straight can be a good place for drivers to overtake as they brake hard into turn 15, a left-handed, second-geared hairpin but drivers are advised by experts to be careful not to get re-overtaken as they come into turn 1.

Lap records

The official lap record for the Sepang International Circuit is 1:34.080, set by Sebastian Vettel during the 2017 Malaysian Grand Prix. The fastest official race lap records at the Sepang International Circuit are listed as:

Fatalities
Marco Simoncelli – 2011 Malaysian motorcycle Grand Prix
Afridza Munandar – 2019 Sepang Asia Talent Cup round

Events

 Current

 March: Sepang 12 Hours
 April: Porsche Carrera Cup Asia
 May: Asia Road Racing Championship, Lamborghini Super Trofeo Asia 
 August: Porsche Carrera Cup Asia
 September: GT World Challenge Asia, GT4 Asia Series
 November: Grand Prix motorcycle racing Malaysian motorcycle Grand Prix

 Former

 A1 Grand Prix (2005–2008)
 Asian Formula Renault (2004–2008, 2014–2015, 2017–2019)
 Asian Le Mans Series 4 Hours of Sepang (2013–2020)
 Audi R8 LMS Cup (2013–2019)
 F3 Asian Championship (2018–2020)
 Ferrari Challenge Asia-Pacific (2011–2017, 2019)
 FIM Endurance World Championship 8 Hours of Sepang (2019)
 Formula 4 South East Asia Championship (2016–2019)
 Formula Asia (2000–2001)
 Formula Nippon (2004)
 Formula One Malaysian Grand Prix (1999–2017)
 Formula Masters China (2011–2017)
 GP2 Asia Series (2008–2009)
 GP2 Series Sepang GP2 round (2012–2013, 2016)
 GP3 Series (2016)
 Intercontinental GT Challenge Sepang 12 Hours (2016)
 JK Racing Asia Series (2006–2012)
 Lamborghini Super Trofeo World Final (2014)
 Speedcar Series (2008)
 Superbike World Championship (2014–2016)
 Super GT (2002, 2004–2013)
 TCR International Series (2015–2016)
 World Touring Car Cup FIA WTCR Race of Malaysia (2019)

See also 
 List of Formula One circuits
 List of sporting venues with a highest attendance of 100,000 or more

Notes

References

External links 
 
 
Map and circuit history at RacingCircuits.info
Sepang International Circuit on Google Maps (Current Formula 1 Tracks)

Government-owned companies of Malaysia
Motorsport venues in Malaysia
Sepang District
Sports venues in Selangor
Formula One circuits
Grand Prix motorcycle circuits
Superbike World Championship circuits
World Touring Car Championship circuits
Malaysian Grand Prix
A1 Grand Prix circuits
Racing circuits designed by Hermann Tilke
1999 establishments in Malaysia
Sports venues completed in 1999
Minister of Finance (Incorporated) (Malaysia)
Privately held companies of Malaysia